Spengen is a hamlet in the Dutch province of Utrecht (province). It is a part of the municipality of Stichtse Vecht, and lies about 10 km northeast of Woerden.

The hamlet was first mentioned in 1217 as Spanien, and is a reference to Spain. It started as a peat excavation settlement in the 11th or 12th century. The postal authorities have placed it under Kockengen, and it has no place name signs. In 1840, it was home to 162 people.

Gallery

References

Populated places in Utrecht (province)
Stichtse Vecht